The 2013 Liga Nacional de Fútbol de Puerto Rico is the fifth season of Puerto Rico's top-division football league. The regular season ran from April to September 2013.

Teams

Standings

Results

Match-day 1

Match-day 2

Match-day 3

Match-day 4

Match-day 5 

Liga Nacional de Fútbol de Puerto Rico
1